Edward Sparrow (December 29, 1810 – July 4, 1882) was an American politician who served as a Confederate States Senator from Louisiana from 1862 to 1865.

Biography
Sparrow was born in Dublin, Ireland. He represented Louisiana in the Provisional Congress of the Confederate States from 1861 to 1862. He was a Senator from Louisiana in both the First and the Second Confederate States congresses, serving from 1862 to 1865. He was one of just eight men to be members of the Confederate Congress from its beginning to its end.  For the entire war he was chairman of the Committee on Military Affairs.

He was the wealthiest man in the Confederate Government and one of the wealthiest in the entire South. The 1860 Census cites his wealth at $1.2 million, which would be comparable to being a billionaire today. In the 1860 census he is listed as having four land holdings, one in Concordia Parish, Louisiana and three in East Carroll Parish, Louisiana, including the Arlington Plantation in Lake Providence, Louisiana. Even in 1880, after the war, East Carroll Parish was the most productive cotton-growing parish or county in the nation. He owned the Arlington Plantation from the 1850s until his death, and is buried in the family cemetery there.

References

External links

 
 Edward Sparrow at The Political Graveyard

1810 births
1882 deaths
19th-century American politicians
American slave owners
Burials in Louisiana
Confederate States of America senators
Deputies and delegates to the Provisional Congress of the Confederate States
Irish emigrants to the United States (before 1923)
People of Louisiana in the American Civil War
Recipients of American presidential pardons
Signers of the Confederate States Constitution
Signers of the Provisional Constitution of the Confederate States